Queen's Road East is a street in Wan Chai, in the north of Hong Kong Island, Hong Kong, connecting Admiralty in the west to Happy Valley in the east. Queen's Road East is one of the four sections of Queen's Road, and historically included Queensway.

Location
Queen's Road East forks to the south from Queensway near Justice Drive, where Queensway turns into Hennessy Road. It runs along the old northern shoreline of Hong Kong Island. It ends in the east at Wong Nai Chung Road in Happy Valley.

History
The settlement of Wan Chai began in pre-British times as a small Chinese community around the present Hung Shing Temple on Queen's Road East. The temple was probably built in 1847 and may have existed previously as a shrine. Originally built next to the shoreline, facing the sea, it is now surrounded by clusters of residential and commercial buildings, as the consequence of successive land reclamation.

Queen's Road East was first developed into a European commercial and residential centre after the arrival of the British in 1841. It had become a mainly Chinese residential, labouring and shop-keeping community by the 1860s.

The eastern part of the road was cut through Morrison Hill, which formerly separated Wanchai from Happy Valley. This section was known as 'Gap Road'. That name was still in use around 1930, even though the high land to the north of the 'gap' was levelled in the 1920s and the materials used to reclaim land from the harbour, under the Praya East Reclamation Scheme.

Although associated with Queen's Road Central and Queen's Road West, the name 'Queen's Road East' has been in use since at least the 1870s.

Features
The following list follows a west-east order. (N) indicates the northern side of the street, while (S) indicates the southern side.

 > intersection with Queensway and junction with Justice Drive
 (N) Sincere Insurance Building ( (Nos. 6–10). First building on the northern side of the street.
 (S) > junction with Monmouth Path
 (S) Three Pacific Place (No. 1)
 (N) Tesbury Centre (Nos. 24–32)
 (S) > junction with Wing Fung Street, part of the Starstreet Precinct shopping and dining area
 (N) > junction with Anton Street
 (S) > junction with Wing Lok Lane
 (N) > junction with Landale Street
 (N) > junction with Li Chit Street
 (S) > junction with St. Francis Street
 (N) > junction with Gresson Street
 (N) > junction with Lun Fat Street
 > intersection with Ship Street
 (N) > junction with Tai Wong Street West
 (S) Hung Shing Temple (Nos. 129–131). Grade I historic building.
 (N) > junction with Tai Wong Street East
 (N) > junction with Swatow Street
 (N) > junction with Amoy Street
 (S) Hopewell Centre (No. 183)
 (N) Nos. 186–190 Queen's Road East. Tong-laus built in the 1930s. Grade III historic buildings.
 (N) > junction with Lee Tung Street
 (N) QRE Plaza (No. 202)
 (N) > junction with Spring Garden Lane
 (N) GARDENEast (No. 222), a 28-storeys serviced apartments building
 (S) Wu Chung House (No. 213)
 (N) > junction with McGregor Street
 (S) Old Wan Chai Post Office (No. 221), a declared monument
 (S) > junction with Wan Chai Gap Road
 (N) > junction with Tai Yuen Street
 (N) Hotel Indigo Hong Kong Island (No. 246)
 (N) MLC Tower (No. 248)
 (S) Queen's Cube (No. 239), a 29-storeys apartment building. Completed in 2010.
 (S) > junction with Stone Nullah Lane
 (N) > junction with Wan Chai Road
 (N) Old Wan Chai Market (No. 264). Grade III historic building.
 (S) > junction with Kennedy Street
 (N) Hong Kong Jockey Club Garden
 (N) Ruttonjee Hospital (No. 266). Merged with Tang Shiu Kin Hospital in 1998. The Hong Kong Tuberculosis, Chest and Heart Disease Association building is a Grade III historic building.
 (S) > junction with Kennedy Road
 (S) Wah Yan College (No. 281). Located on Mount Parish.
 (S) Portals No. 79, 80 and 81 of the former air raid precaution (ARP) tunnels, which were built under Mount Parish some time before the Battle of Hong Kong in 1941.
 (N) Wan Chai Park
 (N) > junction with Wood Road
 (S) > junction with Stubbs Road
 (S) Khalsa Diwan Sikh Temple (No. 371). Grade II historic building.
 (N) Queen Elizabeth Stadium (opposite Cosmopolitan Hotel)
 (S) Dorsett Wanchai Hong Kong Hotel (formerly Cosmopolitan Hotel) (Nos. 387–397). Located at the eastern end of the street. The building was formerly the location of the Hong Kong Branch of the Xinhua News Agency.
 > intersection with Wong Nai Chung Road opposite the northwestern part of Happy Valley Racecourse, and junction with Morrison Hill Road

Intersecting streets and lanes

North side
Most streets and lanes having a northern junction with Queen's Road East connect with Johnston Road, located northward. The exceptions are Anton Street, McGregor Street and Wood Road. Since Queen's Road East runs mostly along the original shoreline of Hong Kong Island, these streets have been built on early land reclamation. The streets and lanes connecting with the north side of Queen's Road East are from west to east:
 Anton Street. Named after Charles Edward Anton. A short street connecting Queen's Road East to Queensway.
 Landale Street
 Li Chit Street. Part of the street was removed to give way to the Li Chit Garden apartment tower.
 Gresson Street. The Open Market in Gresson Street is part of the Wan Chai Heritage Trail.
 Lun Fat Street
 Ship Street (also south side)
 Tai Wong Street West. Connects with Queen's Road East across the street from Hung Shing Temple. It derives its name from the temple, as "Tai Wong" is an alternate name for Hung Shing.
 Tai Wong Street East. Connects with Queen's Road East across the street from Hung Shing Temple.
 Swatow Street. Named after Shantou.
 Amoy Street. Named after Xiamen.
 Lee Tung Street aka. Wedding Card Street
 Spring Garden Lane
 McGregor Street. Connects Queen's Road East with Cross Street.
 Tai Yuen Street aka. "Toy Street", after the toy shops of the street. The Open Market in Tai Yuen Street and Cross Street is part of the Wan Chai Heritage Trail.
 Wan Chai Road
 Wood Road is located further east, past Wan Chai Park, and connects Queen's Road East to Wan Chai Road

South side
The only street crossing with Queen's Road East, i.e. having both north and south junctions with the Road, is Ship Street. The streets and lanes connecting with the south side of Queen's Road East are from west to east:
 Monmouth Path
 Wing Fung Street, part of the Starstreet Precinct shopping and dining area.
 Wing Lok Lane, a short street connecting Queen's Road East to Sun Street
 St. Francis Street
 Ship Street (also north side)
 Wan Chai Gap Road
 Stone Nullah Lane
 Kennedy Street
 Kennedy Road
 Stubbs Road

In popular culture
The 1991 song, also titled "Queen's Road East", by Taiwanese singer Lo Ta-yu and Hong Kong singer-composer Ram Chiang makes references to the handover of Hong Kong to China.

References

 
Roads on Hong Kong Island